The Bangladesh Film and Television Institute is a Bangladesh government institute for research and training on film making. The current Director of the institute is Maruf Nawaz.

History
The Bangladesh Film and Television Institute was established through the passage of Bangladesh Film and Television Institute Bill (Amendment) in the Parliament of Bangladesh in 2019. The bill was moved by Information Minister Hasan Mahmud and was passed through a unanimous vote. The institute is managed by a six-member management committee and run by a director nominated by the Government of Bangladesh.

References

2019 establishments in Bangladesh
Organisations based in Dhaka
Research institutes in Bangladesh
Ministry of Information and Broadcasting (Bangladesh)